Manfred Bockenfeld (born 23 July 1960) is a German former professional footballer who played as a defender.

Honours
Werder Bremen
UEFA Cup Winners' Cup: 1991–92
Bundesliga: 1992–93

References

External links
 
 

1960 births
Living people
People from Borken (district)
Sportspeople from Münster (region)
Association football defenders
German footballers
Germany international footballers
Bundesliga players
2. Bundesliga players
Fortuna Düsseldorf players
SV Waldhof Mannheim players
SV Werder Bremen players
1. FC Bocholt players
Olympic footballers of West Germany
West German footballers
Footballers at the 1984 Summer Olympics
Footballers from North Rhine-Westphalia